Nossen is a town in the district of Meissen, in Saxony, Germany. It is located 80 km southeast of Leipzig. The town is dominated by a large Renaissance castle. Nossen is best known for its proximity to a motorway junction where the A14 merges onto the A4.

Geography

Neighboring towns 
Nearest towns are Roßwein, Großschirma, Reinsberg and Striegistal in Mittelsachsen districts and Käbschütztal, Lommatzsch and Klipphausen in the Meißen district.

History 
During World War II, a subcamp of Flossenbürg concentration camp was located here.

Historical population 
From 1995, recorded on 31 December, unless otherwise noted:

Personalities

Sons and daughters of the city

 Friedrich Funcke (1642-1699), clergyman, cantor and composer
 Paul Richter (1859-1944), architect
 Friedrich Wilhelm Quintscher (1883-1945), founder of the order and author, who came to Adonism
 Manfred von Killinger (1886-1944) Nazi politician and diplomat, born on Gut Lindigt
 Joachim Nitsche (1926-1996), German mathematician
 Wolfgang Mieder (born 1944) professor of German Language and Folklore at the University of Vermont

References

External links 

 Official site 

Meissen (district)